Kinmount House is a 19th-century country house in the parish of Cummertrees  in the historic county of Dumfriesshire in Dumfries and Galloway region, Scotland. The house was designed by Sir Robert Smirke for the 6th Marquess of Queensberry and completed in 1820. It is protected as a category A listed building, and the grounds are included on the Inventory of Gardens and Designed Landscapes in Scotland.

History
The lands of Kinmount were granted to the Carlyle family in the 13th century and acquired by William Douglas, 1st Earl of Queensberry, in 1633. The 4th Duke of Queensberry carried out extensive planting on the estate in the late 18th century. On his death in 1810, Kinmount passed to the  6th Marquess of Queensberry, who commissioned a new house from the English architect Sir Robert Smirke. The Greek Revival house was built between 1813 and 1820, with Smirke's assistant William Burn acting as executant architect. The masonry was carved by John Park using stone brought from Cove quarry near Kirkpatrick-Fleming.

In 1896, The 9th Marquess of Queensberry sold Kinmount to Edward Brook, a wealthy English industrialist who had bought the adjacent Hoddom Castle estate in the 1870s. Brook commissioned alterations and extensions to the house from Dumfries architects James Barbour and J. M. Bowie. These included the roof balustrades and urns and the service court to the northwest. The house found use as Kinmount Auxiliary Hospital during both the First and Second World Wars. Between 1988 and 1998 the house was owned by Steve Ovett.
 
The house was owned by Kinmount Leisure Ltd, which rents out holiday accommodation with access to outdoor sports. The Kinmount and Hoddom estates are owned by the Brook family trust. The Brook family has begun a restoration of Kinmount and now offers wedding, and leisure accommodations.

The Queensberry family burial ground is within the bounds of Kinmount House on Gooley Hill. The burial ground contains several sculptured monuments from the late-19th and early-20th centuries, a tall Celtic cross, and is surrounded by a circular iron fence.

References

External links
Kinmount House

Country houses in Dumfries and Galloway
Category A listed buildings in Dumfries and Galloway
Listed houses in Scotland
Inventory of Gardens and Designed Landscapes